Bayah (also, Bāyah and Bāya) is a town in Badghis Province, Afghanistan.

References

Populated places in Badghis Province